Rudra Pratap Singh Bundela (r. 1501–1531) was the founder and first raja of the kingdom that became the princely state of Orchha, India, during the Lodhi Dynasty . His name is sometimes spelled Rudrapratap Singh and his last name, Bundela, is often omitted.
 
He reigned between 1501–1531, during which time he built the fort at what is now the town of Orchha, on the banks of the river Betwa. He moved his capital from Garh Kundar to that town in 1531 and died in the same year.

References 

1531 deaths
16th-century Indian monarchs
History of Madhya Pradesh
Bundelkhand
Rajput rulers